Ash Creek is located in southeastern Arizona in the Pinaleño Mountain Range, part of Coronado National Forest.

Fish species
Apache trout

References

External links
Arizona Fishing Locations Map
Arizona Boating Locations Facilities Map

Rivers of Arizona
Rivers of Graham County, Arizona